Achille C. Varzi (born May 8, 1958) is an Italian-born philosopher who is John Dewey Professor of philosophy at Columbia University. He graduated from the University of Trento and received his PhD in philosophy from the University of Toronto. Varzi is also Bruno Kessler Honorary Professor at the University of Trento and, since 2017, Visiting Professor at the University of Italian Switzerland.

Work
Varzi has made notable contributions to the fields of philosophical logic (mainly vagueness, supervaluationism, paraconsistency, formal semantics) and metaphysics (mainly mereology and mereotopology, causation, events, and issues relating to identity and persistence through time). His first book, Holes and Other Superficialities (1994, with Roberto Casati), was an exploration of the realist ontology of common sense and naive physics. His more recent work is inspired by a nominalist-conventionalist stance.

Varzi is currently an editor of The Journal of Philosophy and an advisory editor of the Stanford Encyclopedia of Philosophy. Varzi is also a prolific writer for the general public and contributes regularly to several Italian newspapers.

Achille C. Varzi is a second cousin of the Italian racecar driver Achille Varzi.

Books
 Mereology (with A. J. Cotnoir), Oxford: Oxford University Press, 2021.
 I colori del bene, Naples: Orthotes, 2015.
 Le tribolazioni del filosofare. Comedia Metaphysica ne la quale si tratta de li errori & de le pene de l’Infero (with Claudio Calosi), Rome: Laterza, 2014.
 Ontologie, Paris, Ithaque, 2010.
 Il mondo messo a fuoco, Rome: Laterza, 2010. 
 Insurmountable Simplicities. Thirty-nine Philosophical Conundrums (with Roberto Casati), New York: Columbia University Press, 2006; also translated into French, Spanish, Portuguese, Italian, Polish, Greek, Chinese, Korean.
 Il pianeta dove scomparivano le cose. Esercizi di immaginazione filosofica (with Roberto Casati), Torini: Einaudi, 2006.
 Parole, oggetti, eventi e altri argomenti di metafisica, Rome: Carocci, 2001.
 An Essay in Universal Semantics, Dorrecht, Kluwer, 1999.
 Parts and Places. The Structures of Spatial Representation (with Roberto Casati), Boston (MA): MIT Press, 1999.
 Theory and Problems of Logic (with John Nolt and Dennis Rohatyn), New York: McGraw-Hill, 1998.
 Holes and Other Superficialities (with Roberto Casati), Boston (MA): MIT Press, 1994.

See also
American philosophy
List of American philosophers

References

External links

 Complete bibliography
 Varzi's personal webpage at Columbia University
 Varzi's "negative" biography

Living people
Columbia University faculty
20th-century American philosophers
21st-century American philosophers
Analytic philosophers
20th-century Italian philosophers
21st-century Italian philosophers
1958 births